The curve-billed tinamou (Nothoprocta curvirostris) is a type of tinamou commonly found in high-altitude grassland and shrubland habitats in the Andes of South America.

Etymology
Crypturellus is formed from three Latin or Greek words.  kruptos meaning covered or hidden, oura meaning tail, and ellus meaning diminutive.  Therefore, Crypturellus means small hidden tail.

Taxonomy
All tinamou are from the family Tinamidae, and in the larger scheme are also ratites. Unlike other ratites, tinamous can fly, although in general, they are not strong fliers. All ratites evolved from prehistoric flying birds, and tinamous are the closest living relative of these birds.

Subspecies
The curve-billed tinamou has two subspecies as follows:
 N. c. curvirostris, the nominate race, occurs in the Andes of central and southern Ecuador and northern Peru (Cordillera del Condor)
 N. c. peruviana occurs in the Andes of northern and central Peru; eastern Piura, Cajamarca, Amazonas, western San Martín, La Libertad, Ancash, and Huánuco Regions

Characteristics
Its upper parts are dark brown streaked with white and spotted with black. Its breast is rufous and spotted with white, its belly is tawny-buff and its crown is black, the sides of its head, and its throat and foreneck are white. Finally, its legs are brown in color.

Behavior
Like other tinamous, the curve-billed tinamou eats fruit off the ground or low-lying bushes. They also eat small amounts of invertebrates, flower buds, tender leaves, seeds, and roots. The male incubates the eggs which may come from as many as 4 different females, and then will raise them until they are ready to be on their own, usually 2–3 weeks. The nest is located on the ground in dense brush or between raised root buttresses.

Range and habitat
This tinamou lives in the Andes of central and southern Colombia, through Ecuador and northern and central Peru. It also can be found in high-altitude shrubland and pasture.

Conservation

Footnotes

References
 
 
 
 
 

curve-billed tinamou
Ratites
curve-billed tinamou
Birds of the Ecuadorian Andes
Birds of the Peruvian Andes
curve-billed tinamou
curve-billed tinamou
curve-billed tinamou